A Scotticism is a phrase or word which is characteristic of dialects of the Scots language.

Overview
Scotticisms are generally divided into two types: covert Scotticisms, which generally go unnoticed as being particularly Scottish by those using them, and overt Scotticisms, usually used for stylistic effect, with those using them aware of their Scottish nature.
Perhaps the most common covert Scotticism is the use of wee (meaning small or unimportant) as in "I'll just have a wee drink...". This adjective is used frequently in speech at all levels of society.

An archetypal example of an overt Scotticism is "", which translates as "Oh yes, just now". This phrase is often used in parody by non-Scots and although the phrases "" and "" are in common use by Scots separately, they are rarely used together. Other phrases of this sort include:

 Hoots mon!
  ("There's a mouse loose about this house"), a standard cliché highlighting Scots-language pronunciation
   (a phrase popularised by the music hall entertainer Harry Lauder)
  literally translates to "Long may your chimney smoke!", signifying "may you live long"
  (well known from the comic strip character Oor Wullie)
Many leading figures of the Scottish Enlightenment, particularly David Hume, strove to excise Scotticisms from their writing in an attempt to make their work more accessible to an English and wider European audience. In the following passage, Hume's contemporary James Boswell pondered upon the reasons why the Scots and the English were not always mutually intelligible:

It is thus that has arisen the greatest difference between English and Scots. Half the words are changed only a little, but the result of that is that a Scot is often not understood in England. I do not know the reason for it, but it is a matter of observation that although an Englishman often does not understand a Scot, it is rare that a Scot has trouble in understanding what an Englishman says... It is ridiculous to give the reason for it that a Scot is quicker than an Englishman and consequently cleverer in understanding everything. It is equally ridiculous to say that English is so musical that it charms the ears and lures men to understand it, while Scots shocks and disgusts by its harshness. I agree that English is much more agreeable than Scots, but I do not find that an acceptable solution for what we are trying to expound. The true reason for it is that books and public discourse in Scotland are in the English tongue.

Modern authorities agree that the Scots language was gradually eclipsed after the adoption of the Protestant English Bible during the Scottish Reformation and as a result of the later institutional dominance of southern English following the Union of the Crowns in 1603 and the Act of Union in 1707. Scots Law was a notable exception in retaining much of its traditional terminology such as Act of Sederunt, sheriff-substitute, procurator fiscal, sasine, pursuer, interlocutor (court order) and messenger-at-arms. There is now a strong move in some quarters to restore the use of Scots.

Examples

Examples of Scotticisms in everyday use include:

 Where do you stay? meaning "Where do you live?" Possible answer: "I stay in Dundee"
 ? meaning "Where do you live?" Possible answer: ""
  meaning "I don't know"
  meaning "Don't you know?"
  meaning "I'll accompany you some of the way" (or meaning "I'll see you at home")
  meaning "I'm going shopping for groceries."
  meaning "I'm very embarrassed"
  meaning "I'm soaked" (usually from rain)
  meaning "She's the same age as him" 
  meaning "Let me have a turn now" (for example, children playing)
  meaning "Are you thinking of moving house?" (cognate to Norwegian flytte, to move [house]).
  meaning "He's in a rage over it"
  meaning "You're an awful gossip"
  meaning "You're talking nonsense". Also 
  meaning "I'll give him a serious telling off"; also  meaning "Give it everything you've got!"
  meaning "I'm feeling exhausted"
  meaning "I'll see you a week on Monday"
  meaning "I've just been at the doctor's"
  meaning "It's getting dark earlier at night"
  meaning "It's my throw-in" (when playing football)
  meaning "He was squatting down"
  meaning "Up to his armpits"
  meaning "I was shivering with cold at the bus stop"
  meaning "You missed out on a good time last night" (by not being at the event, e.g. a party or football match)
  meaning "Don't get worked up/fussed" (orig. from French )
  meaning "What are you looking for?" or (in pubs) "What will you have to drink?"
  meaning "definitely not!" in sarcastic response to a question or to challenge a presumption
  is an imperative meaning "Will you not do that!?" in response to receiving a fright, or being annoyed by a person's actions
  meaning "goodbye, literally: 'goodbye for now'" as a way of saying goodbye.

See also 

 Anti-Scottish sentiment
 Dictionary of the Scots Language
 Doric
 Lallans
 Languages in the United Kingdom
 Phonological history of the Scots language
 Scottish Corpus of Texts and Speech
 Scottish English

References 

 
 
 
 
Scots-language writers
Scottish people